Picnic Point High School is a government high school located in the suburb of Picnic Point, New South Wales, Australia.

The school has approximately 1000 students in Years 7 to 12. It prepares students for the Higher School Certificate (HSC) in Year 12, and the Record of School Achievement for those students who leave school before attaining the HSC. The school celebrated its 50th anniversary on Saturday, 31 March 2012.

Notable alumni 

 Rod Bowercricketer; represented NSW and Tasmania
 Lachlan Burrrugby league player; played with the Australia Schoolboy rugby league team
 Ashleigh Gardnercricketer; member of the national women's team
 Jarrad Hickeyrugby league player; played with the Canterbury-Bankstown Bulldogs
 Peter JonesAustralian naval officer; Vice-Admiral
 Cameron Phelpsrugby league player with Canterbury-Bankstown Bulldogs and Wigan Warriors
 Peter Smithrugby league player with Canterbury-Bankstown, South Sydney and Gold Coast

Notable current and former staff 
 Alan Ashtonmember of the New South Wales Legislative Assembly (1999–2011)
 Ted Glossopcoach of the Canterbury-Bankstown Bulldogs rugby league team
 John MurraySpeaker of the New South Wales Legislative Assembly
 Geoff SmithAustralian decathlon champion

References

Further reading

Public high schools in Sydney
1962 establishments in Australia
Educational institutions established in 1962
South Western Sydney